The following is a list of related people who have played international rugby union.

Argentina
Felipe Contepomi and Manuel Contepomi; twin brothers
Carlos Ignacio Fernández Lobbe and Juan Martín Fernández Lobbe; brothers
Juan Fernández Miranda and Nicolás Fernández Miranda; brothers

Australia
Harald Baker and Snowy Baker; brothers
Stewart Boyce and James Boyce; twins, on left and right wings
Albert Burge and Peter Burge; brothers - also brothers of rugby league internationals Albert Burge and Laidley Burge
Ernie Carr and Slip Carr; brothers
Alfred "Ginger" Colton and Tom "Puddin" Colton; brothers
Eric Dore and Micky Dore; brothers
Gary Ella, Glen Ella, and Mark Ella; brothers – Glen and Mark are twins
Lew Evans and Poley Evans; brothers
 Saia Fainga'a, Anthony Fainga'a and Colby Fainga'a; brother (Saia and Anthony are twins)
Eric Ford and Jack Ford; brothers
Kristy Giteau and Matt Giteau; sister and brother
Anthony Herbert and Daniel Herbert; brothers
Jake Howard, Pat Howard, and Cyril Towers; Jake is Pat's father; Cyril is Pat's grandfather and Jake's father-in-law
Bryan Hughes and James Hughes; brothers
Tom Lawton, Snr, Tom Lawton, Jnr and Rob Lawton; Tom, Snr is Tom, Jnr and Rob's grandfather
Bob Loudon and Darby Loudon; brothers. The Loudons were the first brothers to both captain their national side at rugby union
Graeme Macdougall and Stuart Macdougall; brothers
Bill Marrott and Robert Marrott; brothers
The McLean family: Doug McLean, Sr. was the father of Doug McLean, Jr., Bill McLean, and Jack McLean. These three were all uncles of Jeff McLean and Paul McLean. Bill's son Peter McLean has also represented Australia.
Jack Meibusch and Lou Meibusch; brothers
Pat Murphy and William Murphy; brothers
Frank Nicholson and Fred Nicholson; brothers
Iggy O'Donnell and Jack O'Donnell; brothers
Clarrie Prentice and Ward Prentice; brothers
Myer Rosenblum and Rupert Rosenblum; father and son
Frank Row and Norm Row; brothers
Arnold Tancred, Harry Tancred, and Jim Tancred; brothers
Hugh Taylor and Johnny Taylor; brothers
Dick Thornett and John Thornett; brothers. A further brother, Ken Thornett, represented Australia at rugby league
Colin Windon and Keith Windon; brothers

Canada
Jamie Mackenzie and Phil Mackenzie; brothers
Kelly Russell and Laura Russell; sisters
John Tait and Luke Tait; brothers
 Mike and Dan Pletch; twin brothers

Chile

Ramón Ayarza was the father of José Ramón Ayarza, Vicente Ayarza and Iñaki Ayarza; brothers
Emilio Saavedra was the father of Domingo Saavedra and Clemente Saavedra; twins brothers
Cristián Huerta and Marcelo Huerta; brothers
José Ignacio Larenas and Juan Pablo Larenas; brothers

England
Delon Armitage and Steffon Armitage; brothers
John Birkett and Reg Birkett; John was Reg's son
Ben Curry and Tom Curry; identical twin brothers
James Davidson and Joseph Davidson; brothers
Andy Farrell and Owen Farrell; Andy is Owen's father
Charles Gibson, George Ralph Gibson, and Thomas Gibson; brothers
Dick Greenwood and Will Greenwood; Dick is Will's father
Jonathan Joseph and Will Joseph; brothers
Alex Lozowski, and Rob Lozowski; Rob is Alex's father
Francis Luscombe and John Luscombe; brothers
Cecil Milton, Jumbo Milton, and William Henry Milton; brothers Cecil and Jumbo were sons of William Henry
Charles Pillman and Robert Pillman; brothers
Ivor Preece and Peter Preece; Ivor was Peter's father
Alan Rotherham and Arthur Rotherham; cousins
Alex Sanderson and Pat Sanderson; brothers
Edward Scott and Frank Sholl Scott; Edward was Frank's son
Mason Scott and William Martin Scott; brothers
Frederick Stokes and Lennard Stokes; brothers
Frank Stout and Percy Stout; brothers
Bill Tucker and William Eldon Tucker; Bill was William's son
Edward Beadon Turner and George Robertson Turner; brothers
Rory Underwood and Tony Underwood; brothers
Harry Vassall and Henry Vassall; Harry was Henry's uncle
Marcus Watson and Anthony Watson; brothers
Ben Youngs, Nick Youngs, and Tom Youngs; Nick is Ben and Tom's father
Billy Vunipola and Mako Vunipola; brothers
Rob Fidler and John Fidler; John is Rob’s father

Fiji
Bill Cavubati and Tevita Cavubati; brothers
Jimi Damu and Ilaitia Damu; brothers
Joeli Lesavua, Apenisa Naevo, Manoa Naevo, and Semisi Naevo; Joeli is the father of the three Naevo brothers
Tomasi Rabaka, Samisoni Rabaka; brothers
Taito Rauluni, Jacob Rauluni, Mosese Rauluni and Waisale Serevi; Taito is father of the brothers Jacob and Mosese, who are Waisale's first cousin.
Aca Ratuva and Vula Maimuri; brothers
Salesi Ma'afu (Australia), Campese Ma'afu (Fiji), Apakuki Ma'afu (Tonga);brothers
Ifereimi Rawaqa and Taniela Rawaqa; brothers
Seremaia Bai and Setareki Koroilagilagi; brothers
Michael Tagicakibau (Fiji) and Sailosi Tagicakibau (Samoa); brothers
Tomasi Soqeta and Nemia Soqeta; brothers
Josh Matavesi and Sam Matavesi; brothers
Sekonaia Kalou and Apisalome Ratuniyarawa; brothers
Pio Tuwai Josua Tuisova and Filipo Nakosi  half brothers (same father)
Radike Samo and Ravuamo Samo; brothers
Kameli Ratuvou and Iliesa Keresoni; brothers

France
Laurent Bidart, Jean-Baptiste Élissalde and Jean-Pierre Élissalde; Laurent was Jean-Pierre's father-in-law, Jean-Pierre is Jean-Baptiste's father
André Boniface and Guy Boniface; brothers
Didier Camberabero, Guy Camberabero, and Lilian Camberabero; Didier is Guy's son and Lilian's nephew
Stéphane Castaignède and Thomas Castaignède; brothers
Claude Dourthe, Richard Dourthe, Raphaël Ibañez, and Olivier Magne; Claude is Richard's son and Raphaël and Olivier's father-in-law. NB: Mathieu Dourthe is unrelated
Julien Laharrague and Nicolas Laharrague; brothers
Marc Lièvremont, Matthieu Lièvremont, and Thomas Lièvremont; brothers
Émile Ntamack, Francis Ntamack and Romain Ntamack; Émile and Francis are brothers and Romain is Émile's son and Francis' nephew.
Alain Penaud and Damian Penaud; Alain is Damian's father
Aurélien Rougerie and Jacques Rougerie; Aurélien is Jacques' son
David Skrela and Jean-Claude Skrela; David is Jean-Claude's son  
Claude Spanghero and Walter Spanghero; brothers
Dimitri Yachvili and Michel Yachvili; Dimitri is Michel's son

Germany
Domenick Davies and Kieron Davies; brothers
Guillaume Franke and Matthieu Franke; brothers
Christopher Liebig and Steffen Liebig; brothers
Armon Trick and Marcus Trick; brothers
Dennis Walger and Markus Walger; brothers

Ireland
Charles Beamish and George Beamish; brothers
Rory Best and Simon Best; brothers
Lawrence Bulger and Michael Joseph Bulger; brothers
Andrew Clinch and Jamie Clinch; father and son
Des Fitzgerald and Luke Fitzgerald; Des is Luke's father
Arthur Gwynn and Lucius Gwynn; brothers. Two other brothers, John Tudor Gwynn and Robert Gwynn, represented Ireland at cricket
Arnold Harvey, Duncan Harvey and Frederick Harvey; brothers
Samuel Irwin and Sinclair Irwin; Samuel was Sinclair's father
Dave Kearney and Rob Kearney; brothers
Mike Kiernan, Tom Kiernan and Mick Lane; Mike is the nephew of Tom, and also of Mick Lane.
James Magee, Joseph Magee, and Louis Magee; brothers. James did not represent Ireland internationally, but did represent the British and Irish Lions
Kenny Murphy, Noel Murphy jr., and Noel Murphy sr.; Kenny is Noel jr's son and Noel sr's grandson
Barry O'Driscoll and John O'Driscoll; brothers. Brian O'Driscoll is also related
Kevin O'Flanagan and Mick O'Flanagan; brothers
Richard Wallace, Paul Wallace, and David Wallace; brothers
Arthur Knight Wallis, William Armstrong Wallis, Clive O'Neill Wallis, and Thomas Gill Wallis; Arthur and William were brothers, and were uncles of Clive and Thomas
Gordon Wood and Keith Wood; Gordon was Keith's father

Italy
Arturo Bergamasco, Mauro Bergamasco, and Mirco Bergamasco; Arturo is the father of brothers Mauro and Mirco
Marcello Cuttitta and Massimo Cuttitta; twin brothers
Ivan Francescato, Bruno Francescato, Nello Francescato and Rino Francescato; brothers
Andrea Pratichetti and Matteo Pratichetti; brothers

Japan
Lopeti Oto and Nataniela Oto; brothers
Nofomuli Taumoefolau, Koliniasi Holani and Sioape Latu Holani; Nofomuli is the uncle of brothers Koliniasi and Sioape

Luxembourg
Martin Abel and Nick Abel; Nick is Martin's son
Philip Barnard and Tertius Barnard; brothers
Greg Brittin and Jason Brittin; brothers
Andrew Browne and Scott Browne; Scott is Andy's son
Steve Clarke and James Clarke; brothers
Jean-Claude Da Col and Julian Da Col; Julian is Claude's son
Ray Fitzpatrick and John Fitzpatrick; John is Ray's son
Richard Geoffreys, Nick Geoffreys, and Gareth Geoffreys; Gareth and Nick are Richard's sons
Loic Herve, Fred Herve and Cedric Herve; brothers (XV and VII)
Romain Kimmel and Guillaume Kimmel; brothers (XV and VII)
Mike Lowe, Christian Lowe, and Mark Lowe (7s); Christian and Mark are Mick's sons
Johan Lux and Thibault Lux; brothers
Marcello Ridolfi and Steve Ridolfi; Steve is Marcello's son
Rob Rogers and Euan Rodgers; Euan is Rob's son
Andrew Thompson and Martin Thompson; brothers (XV and VII)
Alex Van Zeeland and Josh Van Zeeland; Josh is Alex's son (XV and VII)
Tony Whiteman and Bruce Whiteman; brothers (XV and VII)
Phill Williams and Rhys Williams; Rhys is Phill's son

New Zealand
James Archer and Robin Archer; James is Robin's uncle
John Ashworth and Brodie Retallick; John is Brodie's uncle
The Bachop-Mauger family: Graeme Bachop and Stephen Bachop (brothers) are both uncles of Aaron Mauger and Nathan Mauger. Stephen's wife was Sue Garden-Bachop. Another uncle of Aaron and Nathan is former world speedway champion Ivan Mauger. Stephen and Sue's son Jackson Garden-Bachop has represented New Zealand at age group level, and their daughter Georgia Garden-Bachop has done the same at hockey. Graeme also represented Japan internationally and Stephen also represented Samoa.
Beauden Barrett, Kane Barrett, Blake Barrett, Scott Barrett, Jordie Barrett and Kevin Barrett; Kevin is the father of the brothers Beauden, Kane, Blake, Scott, and Jordie. In June 2018, Beauden, Jordie, and Scott became the first group of three brothers to start in the same test for the All Blacks.
Kevin Barry, Liam Barry, and Ned Barry; Liam is Kevin's son and Ned's grandson
Bill Birtwistle, Mark Birtwistle and Beaudene Birtwistle; Mark is Bill's nephew and Beaudene's father. Mark represented Samoa internationally.
Todd Blackadder and Ethan Blackadder; Todd is Ethan's father
Daniel Braid and Gary Braid; Gary is Daniel's father. Daniel's brother Luke Braid has represented New Zealand at age-group level
Robin Brooke and Zinzan Brooke; brothers
Handley Brown, Henry Brown, and Ross Brown; Handley and Henry were brothers, Ross was Handley's son
Dan Carter and Bill Dalley; Dan is Bill's great-nephew
Eric Cockroft and Sam Cockroft; Eric is Sam's nephew
Alfred Cooke and Reuben Cooke; brothers
Greg Cooper and Matthew Cooper; brothers
Andy Dalton and Ray Dalton; Andy is Ray's son
Bob Deans, Bruce Deans, Robbie Deans, and Jock Hobbs; brothers Bruce and Robbie are grandnephews of Bob. Jock was Bruce and Robbie's brother-in-law
John Dick and Malcolm Dick; Malcolm is John's son
Eddie Dunn and Ian Dunn; brothers
Brian Fitzpatrick and Sean Fitzpatrick; Sean is Brian's son
Ben Franks and Owen Franks; brothers
Hosea Gear and Rico Gear; brothers
Ken Going, Sid Going, and Todd Miller; brothers Ken and Sid are uncles of Todd. Sid's son Jared Going has represented New Zealand at rugby sevens
Alan Good and Hugh Good; brothers
Rob Gordon and Steve Gordon; brothers
Jimmy Haig and Laurie Haig; brothers
Nathan Harris and Perry Harris; Nathan is Perry's grandson
Bill Hazlett and Jack Hazlett; Bill is Jack's uncle
Dave Hewett and Jason Hewett; cousins
Arthur Hughes and Kevin Skinner; cousins
Lyn Jaffray and Merv Jaffray; brothers
Jamie Joseph and Leon MacDonald; second-cousins
Arthur Knight, Laurie Knight, and Lawrie Knight; Arthur and Laurie are brothers, Lawrie is Laurie's son
Richard Loe, and Alex Wyllie; Richard is Alex's nephew
Angus Macdonald and Hamish Macdonald; Angus is Hamish's son
Hoani MacDonald, Dan Udy, and Hart Udy; Dan and Hart were cousins. Hoani is Dan's great-grandnephew
Archie McMinn and Paddy McMinn; brothers
Colin Meads and Stanley Meads; brothers
Bill Meates and Kevin Meates; brothers
Andrew Mehrtens and George Mehrtens; Andrew is George's grandson
Graham Mexted and Murray Mexted; Murray is Graham's son
Anton Oliver and Frank Oliver; Anton is Frank's son
Bill Osborne and Glen Osborne; Glen is Bill's nephew
Walter Pringle and Codie Taylor; Codie is Walter's 2nd great grandson
Charles Purdue, George Purdue, and Pat Purdue; Charles and Pat were brothers, George was Pat's son
Henry Roberts and Teddy Roberts; first father and son All Blacks
Alan Robilliard and Ross Smith; Ross was Alan's nephew
Isaac Ross and Jock Ross; Isaac is Jock's son
Annaleah Rush and Xavier Rush; sister and brother
Julian Savea and Ardie Savea; brothers
Jack Shearer and Sydney Shearer; brothers
Exia Shelford, Frank Shelford, and Buck Shelford; Frank is the uncle of cousins Exia and Buck. Further cousins, Adrian Shelford and Darrall Shelford, represented New Zealand and Scotland respectively at rugby league
Johnny Smith and Peter Smith; brothers
Dave Solomon, Frank Solomon, and Josh Kronfeld; Dave and Frank were step-brothers, Josh is their grandnephew
Charles Speight and Michael Speight; Michael is Charles's great-grandson
George Spencer and John Spencer; brothers
Bob Stuart, Kevin Stuart and Jim Kearney; Bob and Kevin were brothers and Jim was their cousin
Murray Taylor, Tom Taylor, and Warwick Taylor; Murray and Warwick are brothers. Tom is Warwick's son
Alan Whetton and Gary Whetton; twin brothers
George Whitelock, Luke Whitelock, and Sam Whitelock; brothers. A fourth brother, Adam Whitelock, has represented New Zealand at rugby sevens
Sonny Bill Williams, and Niall Williams (rugby union), brother and sister
Fred Woodman, and Kawhena Woodman; brothers
Daniel Ripata and Seta Tamnivalu and Sione Lauaki; relations

Portugal
David Mateus and Diogo Mateus; twin brothers
Vasco Uva and Gonçalo Uva; brothers
João Uva cousin of Vasco Uva and Gonçalo Uva; cousins

Romania 

 Haralambie Dumitraș and Iulian Dumitraș; Iulian is Haralambie's son.
 Viorel Morariu and Octavian Morariu; Octavian is Viorel's son.
 Gheorghe Ion and Adrian Ion; Adrian is Gheorghe 's son.
 Andrei Ursache and Valentin Ursache; brothers.

Samoa
Census Johnston and James Johnston; brothers
Lolani Koko, Kofe Koko and Ali Koko; Lolani is Kofe's brother and Ali's uncle
Jack Lam and Pat Lam; cousins
Trevor Leota and Va'aiga Tuigamala; second cousins. Tuigamala played internationally for both Samoa and New Zealand

Scotland
Robert Ainslie and Thomas Ainslie; brothers
Allen Arthur and John Arthur; brothers
John Beattie and Johnnie Beattie; John is Johnnie's father. Johnnie's sister Jen Beattie plays football for Scotland
David Bedell-Sivright and John Bedell-Sivright; brothers
Alastair Biggar and Mike Biggar; cousins
Alasdair Boyle and Cameron Boyle; brothers
Gordon Brown and Peter Brown; brothers. Gordon and Peter's father John Brown played football for Scotland, and their uncle Jim Brown played football for the United States
John Bruce-Lockhart, Logie Bruce Lockhart, and Rab Bruce Lockhart; John was Rab and Logie's father
Alan Bulloch and Gordon Bulloch; brothers
Jim Calder, Finlay Calder, and Lewis Calder; Jim and Finlay are brothers, Lewis is Jim's son
Angus Cameron and Donald Cameron; brothers
Jeremy Campbell-Lamerton and Mike Campbell-Lamerton; Jeremy is Mike's son
James Stewart Carrick and Thomas Chalmers; brothers-in-law
Craig Chalmers and Paula Chalmers; brother and sister
David Chisholm and Robin Chisholm; brothers
George Crabbie and John Crabbie; brothers
Gerard Crole and Phipps Turnbull; half-brothers
Malcolm Cross and William Cross; brothers
Francis Dods and John Dods; brothers
Michael Dods and Peter Dods; brothers. NOTE: Michael and Peter are not related to Francis and John Dods
Andrew Dykes and Jimmy Dykes; brothers
Arthur Dorward and Tom Dorward; brothers. Arthur and Tom are distantly related to New Zealand international Ali Williams
Christy Elliot and Tom Elliot; brothers
Max Evans and Thom Evans; brothers
Zander Fagerson and Matt Fagerson; brothers
Arthur Finlay, James Finlay, and Ninian Finlay; brothers
Alastair Fisher and Colin Fisher; Alastair was Colin's father
Irvine Geddes and Keith Geddes; Irvine was Keith's father
Henry Gedge and Peter Gedge; Henry was Peter's father
Cameron Glasgow and Ron Glasgow; Cameron is Ron's son
Brian Gossman and Jimmy Gossman; brothers
Derrick Grant and Oliver Grant; brothers
Jonny Gray and Richie Gray; brothers
Gavin Hastings, Adam Hastings and Scott Hastings; Gavin and Scott are brothers. Adam is Gavin's son.
Brian Hegarty and John Hegarty; Brian is John's son
Ian Henderson and Mac Henderson; brothers
Ben Hinshelwood and Sandy Hinshelwood; Ben is Sandy's son
Graham Hogg and Stuart Hogg; brothers. Graham and Stuart are distantly related to Northern Ireland footballer George Best.
Peter Horne and George Horne; brothers
Bob Howie and Dave Howie; brothers
Bulldog Irvine and Duncan Irvine; brothers
Roy Laidlaw, Clark Laidlaw, and Greig Laidlaw; Roy is Greig's uncle and Clark is Roy's son. 
Rory Lamont and Sean Lamont; brothers
Alan Lawson, Gregor Lawson, Rory Lawson, and Jim Thompson; Alan is Rory and Gregor's father, and Jim Thompson's uncle. He is also the son-in-law of legendary Scottish rugby commentator Bill McLaren
John Leslie and Martin Leslie; brothers
George Buchanan McClure and James Howe McClure; twin brothers. They were the first twins to both gain international caps at rugby union
Duncan MacGregor and John MacGregor; brothers
K. G. MacLeod and Lewis MacLeod; brothers
Gardyne Maitland and Robert Maitland; brothers
Thomas Roger Marshall and William Marshall; brothers
Bill McEwan and Saxon McEwan; brothers
David Milne, Iain Milne, and Kenny Milne; brothers
George Murray and Ronald Murray; brothers
George Neilson, Gordon Neilson, Robert Neilson, and Willie Neilson; brothers
Andy Nicol and George Ritchie; Andy is George's grandson
Charles Orr and John Orr; brothers
Alex Purves and William Purves; brothers
Bryan Redpath and Cameron Redpath; Bryan is Cameron's father
Charles Reid and James Reid; brothers
Keith Robertson and Mark Robertson; Keith is Mark's father
Edward Ross and James Ross; brothers
Ian Shaw and Robert Wilson Shaw; brothers
Brian Simmers and Max Simmers; Brian is Max's son
Allen Sloan and Donald Sloan; Allen was Donald's father
Charles Stuart and Ludovic Stuart; brothers
Alec Valentine and Dave Valentine; brothers
Gordon Waddell and Herbert Waddell; Gordon was Herbert's son
Archibald Walker and James Walker; brothers
Frank Waters and Joseph Waters; Frank was Joseph's son

South Africa
Geo Cronjé and Jacques Cronjé; brothers
Bismarck du Plessis and Jannie du Plessis; brothers
Carel du Plessis, Willie du Plessis and Michael du Plessis; brothers
Felix du Plessis and Morné du Plessis; Felix is Morné's father. They are the only father and son to have captained the South African national team (NOTE: Felix and Morné are not related to any of the du Plessis above)
 Robert du Preez, Jean-Luc du Preez, Dan du Preez, and Robert du Preez jr; Robert is Jean-Luc, Dan, and Robert jr's father. Jean-Luc and Dan are twins
Schalk Burger and Schalk Burger; Father and Son
Francois Louw and Jan Pickard; Francois is Jan's grandson
Gerhard Morkel and Jacky Morkel; brothers
Akona Ndungane and Odwa Ndungane; twin brothers
Gysie Pienaar and Ruan Pienaar; Gysie is Ruan's father
Jaco Reinach and Cobus Reinach; Jaco is Cobus' father
Chris Rossouw and Pieter Rossouw; brothers
Jan Serfontein and Jack Slater; Jack is Jan's Grandfather.  Boela Serfontein (Jan's older Brother) is also a provincial rugby player, as was their father Boelie Sefontein
Flip van der Merwe and Flippie van der Merwe; Flip is Flippie's son
Moaner van Heerden and Wikus van Heerden; Moaner is Wikus's father
Hasie Versfeld and Oupa Versfeld; brothers
Avril Williams and Chester Williams; Avril is Chester's uncle

Spain
 Daniel Ripol, Oriol Ripol and Roger Ripol; brothers
Alberto Socías and Antonio Socías; brothers
Carlos Souto and Sergio Souto; twin brothers

Tonga
Inoke Afeaki and Stanley Afeaki; brothers. They are second cousins of New Zealand representative Ben Afeaki
Penieli Latu and Sinali Latu; brothers. Sinali also represented Japan internationally
Johnny Ngauamo and Milton Ngauamo; brothers
Hudson Tongaʻuiha and Soane Tongaʻuiha; brothers

United States
Nic Johnson and Fred Paoli; Johnson is Paoli's nephew
Andrew Suniula, Roland Suniula, and Shalom Suniula; brothers
Alipate Tuilevuka and Seta Tuilevuka; brothers

Wales
Billy Bancroft and Jack Bancroft; brothers
Arthur Bassett and Jack Bassett; brothers
Norman Biggs and Selwyn Biggs; brothers
Aled Brew and Nathan Brew; brothers
Arthur Cornish and Fred Cornish; Arthur was Fred's nephew
Harry Day and Harry Phillips; Day was Phillips' uncle
Tom Day and Billy Trew; Tom was Billy's son-in-law
Jonathan "Fox" Davies and James Davies; brothers
Sam Davies and Nigel Davies; Nigel is Sam's father
Willie Davies and Haydn Tanner; cousins
George Dobson and Tom Dobson; brothers
John Dyke and Louis Dyke; brothers
Billy Gore and Jack Gore; Billy was Jack's son
Arthur Gould, Bert Gould, and Bob Gould; brothers. A further brother, Wyatt Gould, represented the United Kingdom at athletics
David Gwynn and William Gwynn; brothers
George Frederick Harding and Theo Harding; brothers
Bert Hollingdale and Thomas Hollingdale; brothers
David James and Evan James; brothers
Barry John, Craig Quinnell, Derek Quinnell, and Scott Quinnell; Derek is Barry's brother-in-law and Craig and Scott's father
Gwyn Jones and Ivor Jones; Gwyn is Ivor's great-nephew
Howell Jones and Howie Jones; Howell was Howie's father
Jack Jones, Ponty Jones, and Tuan Jones; brothers
Will Joseph and Dicky Owen; cousins
Gareth Llewellyn and Glyn Llewellyn; brothers
Willie Llewellyn and Tom Williams; Willie was Tom's nephew
Andy Moore and Steve Moore; brothers
Guy Morgan, Teddy Morgan, and William Llewellyn Morgan; Guy was the nephew of brothers Teddy and William
Paul Moriarty, Richard Moriarty, and Ross Moriarty; Paul is Richard's brother and Ross's father
Charles Nicholl and David Nicholl; brothers
Gwyn Nicholls, Sydney Nicholls, and Bert Winfield; brothers Gwyn and Sydney were brothers-in-law of Bert. Sydney's son Jack Nicholls represented Wales at football
Dai Parker and Tom Parker; brothers
Rowland Phillips and Brian Thomas; Rowland is Brian's son-in-law
Dai Prosser and Glyn Prosser; brothers
Jamie Ringer and Paul Ringer; Jamie is Paul's son
Jamie Robinson and Nicky Robinson; brothers
David Samuel and John Samuel; brothers
Tom Shanklin and Jim Shanklin; Tom is Jim's son
Glyn Stephens and Rees Stephens; Glyn was Rees's father
Anthony Sullivan and Clive Sullivan; Anthony represented Wales at both rugby union and rugby league and Clive represented Wales at rugby league
Bunner Travers and George Travers; Bunner was George's son
Bernard Turnbull and Maurice Turnbull; brothers
Harry Wetter and Jack Wetter; brothers
Bleddyn Williams and Lloyd Williams; brothers. Note: the two Lloyd Williamses, here and lower in the list, are unrelated
Brynmor Williams and Lloyd Williams; Brynmor is Lloyd's father. Note: the two Lloyd Williamses, here and higher in the list, are unrelated
Gareth Powell Williams and Owain Williams; brothers
Thomas Young and Dai Young; Dai is Thomas's father. Thomas is also brother-in-law to Ross Moriarty and son-in-law to Paul Moriarty.

Zimbabwe
Kennedy Tsimba and Richard Tsimba; brothers

Different countries

Vili Alaalatoa and Michael Ala'alatoa (both Samoa), and Allan Alaalatoa (Australia); Vili is Allan and Michael's father
John Allan (Scotland and South Africa) and Tommaso Allan (Italy); John is Tommaso's uncle. Tommaso has also represented Scotland at under-17, under-18 and under-20.
Tomasi Cama (Fiji) and Junior Tomasi Cama (New Zealand); Tomasi is Junior's father
Brent Cockbain (Wales) and Matt Cockbain (Australia); brothers
Jerry Collins (New Zealand), Mike Umaga (Samoa), and Tana Umaga (New Zealand); Mike and Tana are brothers, Jerry was their cousin
Quade Cooper (Australia) and Sean Maitland (Scotland); cousins (see also the Stanley family, below)
Blair Cowan (Scotland) and Pekahou Cowan (Australia); cousins
Ross Cronjé (South Africa) and Guy Cronjé (Zimbabwe); twin brothers
Peter Fatialofa (Samoa) and DJ Forbes (New Zealand); Peter was DJ's uncle.
The Faletau-Vunipola family: Kuli Faletau (Tonga), Taulupe Faletau (Wales), Elisi Vunipola, Feʻao Vunipola, Manu Vunipola (Tonga), Billy Vunipola and Mako Vunipola (England); Kuli is Taulupe's father, and Feʻao's brother-in-law. Feʻao is Billy and Mako's father, and Elisi and Manu's brother. Mako and Billy are Elisi's and Manu's nephews.
Guy Easterby, Simon Easterby (both Ireland), and Elgan Rees (Wales); Guy and Simon are brothers. Simon is Elgan's son-in-law
Emonyi brothers (Kenya). Humphrey Kayange, Collins Injera and Michael Agevi. All three have represented Kenya in HSBC World Rugby Seven Series, Commonwealth Games, Africa Gold Cup.
Doug Howlett (New Zealand) and Nili Latu (Tonga); cousins. Doug is the brother of New Zealand rugby league representative Phil Howlett
Eddie Ioane (Samoa), Akira Ioane and Rieko Ioane (New Zealand); Eddie is Akira's father and Rieko is Akira's brother.
John Kirwan (New Zealand) is John Ah Kuoi's (Samoa) brother-in-law.
Jack Lam, Pat Lam (both Samoa), and Dylan Mika (New Zealand); cousins
Lawrence Little, Nicky Little (both Fiji), and Walter Little (New Zealand); Nicky is the nephew of brothers Lawrence and Walter
Donald MacDonald (Scotland) and Dugald MacDonald (South Africa); brothers
Daniel Manu (Australia) and Nasi Manu (tonga); Daniel is Nasi's uncle, Nasi is also cousin of Sika Manu, who represented New Zealand and Tonga at rugby league
James O'Donnell (New Zealand) and John O'Donnell (Australia); John was James's son
James So'oialo (Samoa), Rodney So'oialo (New Zealand), and Steven So'oialo (Samoa); brothers
The Stanley family: Joe Stanley (New Zealand) is the father of Jeremy Stanley (New Zealand). Chase Stanley and Kyle Stanley, also sons of Joe, have represented New Zealand and Samoa respectively at rugby league. Joe is the uncle of brothers Benson Stanley (New Zealand) and Winston Stanley (Samoa) and their cousin Michael Stanley (Samoa). Joe Stanley is distantly related to Quade Cooper and Sean Maitland (see above) through Maitland's maternal line, and is a cousin of Australian football international Tim Cahill.
The Schuster family: Su'a Peter Schuster is the brother John Schuster and David(Samoa) and the father of Peter Schuster (Australia).
Adriaan Strauss, Andries Strauss (both South Africa), and Richardt Strauss (Ireland); Andries and Richardt are brothers, Adriaan is their cousin
David Sio (Samoa) and Scott Sio (Australia); David is Scott's father
Alesana Tuilagi, Anitelea Tuilagi, Freddie Tuilagi, Henry Tuilagi, Sanele Vavae Tuilagi (all Samoa), and Manu Tuilagi (England); brothers
To'o Vaega (Samoa) and Cardiff Vaega (New Zealand); To'o is Cardiff's father
Akker van der Merwe (South Africa) and Duhan van der Merwe (Scotland); brothers
Billy Vunipola, Mako Vunipola (both England), Manu Vunipola, Elisi Vunipola and Fe'ao Vunipola (all Tonga); Elisi, and Fe'ao are brothers. Fe'ao is Billy and Mako's Father
Bryan Williams (New Zealand), Gavin Williams, and Paul Williams (both Samoa); Gavin and Paul are Bryan's sons

References

 
Families
Rugby union